Murat Erdoğan (born 1 August 1976 in London, England) was a Turkish footballer of English descent who now runs ME10 Football, a professional football management and consultancy firm based in Istanbul.

Playing career
Murat was a left-footed midfielder, who scored 48 goals during 410 professional appearances.  
After being spotted playing during a Sunday league game on Hackney Marshes in London, Murat was invited to play for Mersin İdman Yurdu.  After a transfer to İstanbulspor, Murat's career saw him play for Gaziantepspor, Galatasaray, Malatyaspor, Ankaraspor, Sakaryaspor, MKE Ankaragücü, Sivasspor, Kasımpaşa, and Manisaspor in the Turkish league.  In September 2009, Murat moved to Kasımpaşa S.K. before returning to Mersin İdman Yurdu, where he ended his professional football career, playing for the team he first signed for sixteen years previously.

Professional career
Since 2018, Murat has been the director of ME10 Football, an agency for professional footballers. Murat worked as Sporting Director for Konyaspor from 2015 to 2016 . Prior to that Murat worked for Sivasspor as Sporting Director from June 2013 until February 2014.

Personal
Murat lives in Istanbul, Bodrum and London.  
Murat still regularly plays football  and keeps fit.

References 

1976 births
Living people
Footballers from Greater London
English footballers
Turkish footballers
English people of Turkish Cypriot descent
MKE Ankaragücü footballers
Sakaryaspor footballers
Gaziantepspor footballers
Sivasspor footballers
Galatasaray S.K. footballers
Kasımpaşa S.K. footballers
Süper Lig players
Doping cases in association football
Turkish sportspeople in doping cases
Mersin İdman Yurdu footballers
İstanbulspor footballers
Malatyaspor footballers
Ankaraspor footballers
Manisaspor footballers
Association football midfielders
Sportspeople of Turkish Cypriot descent